The 23rd Indian Infantry Brigade was an infantry brigade formation of the Indian Army during World War II from 1941 to at least 1947. The brigade was formed in February 1941, at Loralai in India and in June 1941, assigned to the 14th Indian Infantry Division. In March 1942, the brigade was reassigned to the 23rd Indian Infantry Division, just before being renumbered 123rd Indian Infantry Brigade. As the 123rd the brigade served in the Burma Campaign with not only the 23rd but with the 14th again and the 5th Indian Infantry Division.

As 123rd Indian Brigade, the brigade served with the Punjab Boundary Force during the Partition of India in 1947.

Formation

23rd Indian Infantry Brigade
1st Battalion, 15th Punjab Regiment
8th Battalion, 10th Baluch Regiment
4th Battalion, 5th Mahratta Light Infantry

123rd Indian Infantry Brigade
1st Battalion, 15th Punjab Regiment to April 1943
8th Battalion, 10th Baluch Regiment to December 1942 and March to April 1943
4th Battalion, 5th Mahratta Light Infantry to June 1942	
10th Battalion, Lancashire Fusiliers July 1942 to April 1943
1st Battalion, 17th Dogra Regiment October 1942 to January 1943 and December 1943 to August 1945
8th Battalion, 6th Rajputana Rifles January to March 1943 and May to June 1943
2nd Battalion, 1st Punjab Regiment July 1943 to April 1944 and September 1944 to August 1945
2nd Battalion, Suffolk Regiment July  1943 to September 1944 
1st Battalion, 18th Royal Garhwal Rifles February 1944
3rd Battalion, 2nd Punjab Regiment April 1944 to March 1945
7th Battalion, York and Lancaster Regiment March to June 1945
3rd Battalion, 9th Jat Regiment April to May 1945
3rd Battalion, 9th Gurkha Rifles July to August 1945

See also

 List of Indian Army Brigades in World War II

References

British Indian Army brigades
Military units and formations in Burma in World War II